Benjamín Jarnés Y Millán (October 7, 1888–August 11, 1949) was a Spanish writer. Having been a soldier for a decade, he quit the army in 1920 and published his first novel in 1924. His second novel El profesor inútil (The Useless Professor, 1926) met with success and was followed by books such as El convidado de papel (1928) and Teoría del zumbel (1930). He fought on the Republican side during the Spanish Civil War, and after General Franco's victory, he fled to Mexico. He turned his attention to writing biographies of writers such as Stefan Zweig and Miguel de Cervantes. In 1948 he returned to Spain, the year before his death in Madrid.

References

Spanish writers
1888 births
1949 deaths